Nicolas Minassian (born 28 February 1973) is a French professional racing driver of Armenian descent.

After finishing 2nd place in the 1993 Formula Renault Eurocup, Marseille-born Minassian graduated to the French Formula Three Championship where he finished runner-up to countryman Laurent Redon at his second attempt in 1995. He then moved to the British series for another two years in a successful partnership with Promatecme and Renault UK that yielded a 4th place in 1996 and 2nd place the following year.

He graduated to Formula 3000 with West Competition for 1998, but failed to impress whilst his teammate Nick Heidfeld mounted a strong challenge for overall honours. The following year, he moved to Kid Jensen Racing where he enjoyed more success, including an emphatic lights-to-flag triumph at Silverstone. He signed for the illustrious Super Nova Racing team in 2000 where he came a strong 2nd in the championship.

Unable to secure a Formula One drive, Minassian drove in 2001 for Target Chip Ganassi Racing with F3000 title adversary Bruno Junqueira in CART and competed in the Indianapolis 500 before being released by the team. In 2002 Minassian won the ASCAR Racing Series oval racing series for RML Group before returning to endurance racing including the 24 Hours of Le Mans for such teams as Creation Autosportif and Pescarolo Sport.

In 2007 he became a factory driver for the Peugeot 908 HDi FAP diesel Le Mans prototype in the European Le Mans Series.

In 2008 he drove the Peugeot 908 diesel Le Mans prototype in the European Le Mans Series. He competed in the 24 Hours of Le Mans with the Peugeot 908.

Outside racing

In 2019 Nicolas Minassian founded a management company together with his former team-mate Jamie Campbell-Walter and María Catarineu, Bullet Sports Management, which represents drivers including FIA WEC and ELMS driver Ferdinand Habsburg, ELMS and FRECA driver Franco Colapinto, FRECA driver Oliver Goethe, GT World Challenge Europe driver Benjamin Goethe, and ELMS drivers Rui Andrade and Diego Menchaca.

Racing record

24 Hours of Le Mans results

Complete International Formula 3000 results
(key) (Races in bold indicate pole position; races in italics indicate fastest lap.)

American Open-Wheel
(key)

CART

IRL IndyCar Series

Indy 500 results

Complete V8 Supercar results

+ Not Eligible for points

Bathurst 1000 results

Complete American Le Mans Series results

Complete Le Mans Series results

Complete WeatherTech SportsCar Championship results
(key) (Races in bold indicate pole position; races in italics indicate fastest lap)

References

External links
 Official Website

1973 births
Living people
Sportspeople from Marseille
French racing drivers
Champ Car drivers
IndyCar Series drivers
Indianapolis 500 drivers
British Formula Three Championship drivers
French Formula Three Championship drivers
24 Hours of Le Mans drivers
French people of Armenian descent
International Formula 3000 drivers
American Le Mans Series drivers
European Le Mans Series drivers
Supercars Championship drivers
TC 2000 Championship drivers
24 Hours of Daytona drivers
Rolex Sports Car Series drivers
FIA World Endurance Championship drivers
24 Hours of Spa drivers
ASCAR drivers
24H Series drivers
Chip Ganassi Racing drivers
Peugeot Sport drivers
Sébastien Loeb Racing drivers
SMP Racing drivers
West Competition drivers
Oreca drivers
Pescarolo Sport drivers
AF Corse drivers
Super Nova Racing drivers
DragonSpeed drivers
WeatherTech SportsCar Championship drivers
OAK Racing drivers
G-Drive Racing drivers